Yannick Gerhardt (born 13 March 1994) is a German footballer who plays as a midfielder for Bundesliga club VfL Wolfsburg. He has represented the Germany national team.

Club career
He made his professional debut on 20 July 2013 in a 2. Bundesliga match against Dynamo Dresden.

Gerhardt signed for Wolfsburg on 27 May 2016.

International career

Senior
On 4 November 2016, Gerhardt was selected by Germany's head coach Joachim Löw for the world-cup qualifier against San Marino and the friendly against Italy. On 15 November, he had his debut match for the German team in the friendly against Italy.

Personal life
Gerhardt's younger sister Anna plays for Turbine Potsdam and has been capped internationally at youth level.

Career statistics

Club

Honours
Germany U21
 UEFA European Under-21 Championship: 2017

Individual
 Fritz Walter Medal U19 Silver: 2013
UEFA European Under-21 Championship Team of the Tournament: 2017

References

External links

Profile at the VfL Wolfsburg website

1994 births
Living people
German footballers
People from Würselen
Sportspeople from Cologne (region)
1. FC Köln players
1. FC Köln II players
VfL Wolfsburg players
Bundesliga players
2. Bundesliga players
Germany youth international footballers
Germany under-21 international footballers
Germany international footballers
Association football midfielders
Footballers from North Rhine-Westphalia